Deanshanger Athletic Football Club is an amateur football club based in Deanshanger, on the outskirts of Milton Keynes. Founded in 1946, the club is affiliated to the Northamptonshire Football Association.

The club achieved FA Charter Standard in 2014; as well as having three teams from Under 18's upwards they also provide ladies football from 16+ there is also a youth section run by the Deanshanger Colts who are also FA Charter Standard. This incorporates boys and girls between the ages of 6–16.

History
Deanshanger Athletic has played in the United Counties League and more recently the North Bucks & District League. Recent times have seen Deanshanger Athletic win League and Cup doubles in consecutive seasons and in 2013-14 Deanshanger Athletic won the North Bucks & District League Intermediate division.

Ground
Deanshanger Athletic play their home games at Folly Road, Deanshanger, Milton Keynes, MK19 6HU.

Honours
League

North Bucks & District League Division One/Premier
 Winners (9): 1950-51, 1951–52, 1952–53, 1954–55, 1956–57, 1958–59, 1959–60, 2001–02, 2002–03,
North Bucks & District League Intermediate Division
 Winners (1): 2013-14
United Counties League Division Three
 Winners (2): 1970-71, 1971–72
Northamptonshire Women's & Girls Football League - Women's Division 2
 Winners (1): 2017-18

Cups

Buckingham Charity Cup
 Winners (7): 1950-51, 1951–52, 1956–57, 1957–58, 1959–60, 1970–71, 2018–19
North Bucks & District League Premier Division Cup
 Winners (2): 2000-01, 2001–02
Northamptonshire Junior Cup
 Winners (1): 1955-56
Northamptonshire Lower Junior Cup
 Winners (1): 1982-83

Current squad

External links
Deanshanger Colts

Football clubs in England
Sport in Milton Keynes
Football clubs in Buckinghamshire
North Bucks & District Football League
United Counties League